George Henry Rainsford was an Australian politician. He was elected to the Western Australian Legislative Council for South Province as a Nationalist in a by-election following Jabez Dodd's death in 1928, but he was never sworn in and he did not take his seat due to the approaching election, in which he was defeated.

References

Year of birth missing
Year of death missing
Nationalist Party of Australia members of the Parliament of Western Australia
Members of the Western Australian Legislative Council
Place of birth missing